Meir Bosak (May 21, 1912  – November 20, 1992) was a Polish-Israeli historian, writer and poet.

Bosak was born in Kraków, Poland in 1912. As a youth, he studied in Warsaw. From 1929, Bosak began publishing articles in Polish and in Hebrew on the history of Polish Jewry. He also wrote essays on Hebrew literature as well as stories and poems. During World War II, Bosak first lived in the Kraków Ghetto and subsequently was sent to the Płaszów concentration camp. Bosak survived the war due to the efforts of Oskar Schindler. Following the war, Bosak emigrated to Israel settling in Tel Aviv.

Published works 
Bosak's published works include:
 Be-Nogah ha-Seneh (1933)
 Ve-Attah Eini Ra'atekha (1957)
 Ba-Rikkud ke-Neged ha-Levanah (1960)
 Aḥar Esrim Shanah (1963)
 Mul Ḥalal u-Demamah (1966)
 Sulam ve-Rosho (1978)
 Ẓamarot bi-Tefillah (1984)
 Rak Demamah po Titpalal (1990)
 Mul Sha'ar ha-Raḥamim (1995)
 Shorashim ve-Ẓamarot (1990)

References

External links
 Interview at the International Institute of Holocaust Studies
 Bosak Family website includes archival photos of Meir Bosak as well as manuscripts of poems written during the Holocaust

1912 births
1992 deaths
20th-century Israeli poets
20th-century Israeli male writers
20th-century Polish male writers
20th-century Polish poets
Gross-Rosen concentration camp survivors
Hebrew-language writers
Israeli historians
Israeli male poets
Kraków Ghetto inmates
Kraków-Płaszów concentration camp survivors
Writers from Kraków
Polish emigrants to Israel
Israeli people of Polish-Jewish descent
20th-century Polish historians
Polish male non-fiction writers
Polish male poets
Schindlerjuden